Pohádka o staré tramvaji (The Old Tram) is a 1961 Czechoslovak film. The film starred Josef Kemr.

References

External links
 

1961 films
Czechoslovak fantasy films
1960s Czech-language films
Czech fantasy films
1960s Czech films